The Three Mesquiteers is a 1936 Western "Three Mesquiteers" B-movie, starring Bob Livingston (in the role later played by John Wayne), Ray "Crash" Corrigan and Syd Saylor. It is first in a 51-film series of "Three Mesquiteers" films based on characters from the novels written by William Colt MacDonald, eight of which starred John Wayne. The film was directed by Ray Taylor, and produced by Nat Levine and written by Jack Natteford.

Plot 
Set in the year 1919, following World War 1, military veterans Lullaby Joslin and Bob Bryant are recovering from their wounds at a U.S. Veterans Hospital and decide to head out to San Juan Basin, New Mexico with some other veterans and apply for ownership of land being given away through the Homestead Acts. Lullaby and Bob and the other veterans arrive at Carrizozo, NM and meet Stony Brooke and Tucson Smith, as well as Brack Canfield who advises the men to keep going west for their own good.

Bob and the other veterans exchange their vehicles for horses and covered wagons for the trek to the San Juan Basin, Lullaby continues on with his motorcycle side car. Brack Canfield tells his brother Olin that what happens next has to look like an accident. Shortly afterwards there is the sound of a blast and an rockslide occurs on the trail, the caravan of veterans are forced to hurry out of the way, and everyone survives.

Stony and Tucson ride back to investigate the landslide and discover that it was no accident, as there are remnants of a dynamite blast. Canfield's men realize that the veterans have survived and attempt to drive off the veterans' horses. Stony and Tucson begin a gunfight with them, Lullaby appears on a hill in his motorcycle side car, and waves on the people behind him, but it is a bluff. Canfield's men take Lullaby's bluff seriously and withdraw thinking there is a gang on its way.

Cast 
 Bob Livingston as Stony Brooke
 Ray Corrigan as Tucson Smith
 Syd Saylor as Lullaby Joslin
 Kay Hughes as Marian Bryant
 J.P. McGowan as Brack Canfield
 Al Bridge as Olin Canfield
 Frank Yaconelli as Pete (Italian vet)
 John Merton as Bull (chief henchman)
 Gene Marvey as Bob Bryant
 Milburn Stone as John (a vet)
 Duke York as Chuck (one-armed vet)
 Nina Quartero as Rosita (waitress) (billed as Nena Quartaro)
 Allen Connor as Milt (one-legged vet)

References

External links 
 The Three Mesquiteers at the Internet Movie Database
 
 
 

1936 films
1936 Western (genre) films
Three Mesquiteers films
Films directed by Ray Taylor
Films set in 1919
American black-and-white films
Republic Pictures films
American Western (genre) films
Films produced by Nat Levine
Films about veterans
1930s English-language films
1930s American films